Balgan (population c. 5,000) is a village situated 23.5 km from Sialkot district. Punjabi is the mother language, but some educated people also speak Urdu. Agriculture is the primary industry, with residents growing rice, wheat, potatoes, sugar cane, watermelon, etc. Saag and rice are staple foods

References

Villages in Sialkot District